Celeste Yim is a Korean-Canadian comedian and writer.

Career 
Yim's career began in the mid-2010s, in indie stand-up shows in Toronto. They then were named to the Bob Curry fellowship for The Second City and worked as a juror for the Toronto Sketch Comedy Festival. In 2017, Flare named them one of Canada's Top 100 Notable Women. They have also written for a number of publications, especially on topics of Korean-Canadian identity and racism in pop culture, including Vice and The Globe and Mail.

In 2019, they were awarded the 2019 Canadian Women Artists' Award by the New York Foundation for the Arts. In May that year, their play Not Only Is Everyone As Wonderful was produced at the National MFA Playwrights Festival.

In 2020, they were hired by Saturday Night Live, the only new writer to be hired for the show during that hiring season. In 2023, within the second-half of season 48, Yim became a writing supervisor for the show.

Personal life 
Yim uses they/them pronouns. They graduated from Toronto French School in 2013. They have a bachelor's degree in media, gender and English from the University of Toronto and a Master of Fine Arts from NYU Tisch School of the Arts.

References

External links 

Living people
Canadian stand-up comedians
University of Toronto alumni
Year of birth missing (living people)
Non-binary comedians
Canadian people of Korean descent